Emile Nurenberg (12 December 1918 – 9 July 1990) was a Luxembourgian footballer. He played in two matches for the Luxembourg national football team from 1948 to 1949. He was also part of Luxembourg's squad for the football tournament at the 1948 Summer Olympics, but he did not play in any matches.

References

External links
 

1918 births
1990 deaths
Luxembourgian footballers
Luxembourg international footballers
Place of birth missing
Association football forwards
FC Progrès Niederkorn players